|}

The Finesse Juvenile Novices' Hurdle is a Grade 2 National Hunt hurdle race in Great Britain which is open to horses aged four years. It is run on the New Course at Cheltenham over a distance of about 2 miles and 1 furlong (2 miles and 179 yards, or 3,382 metres), and during its running there are eight hurdles to be jumped. The race is for novice hurdlers, and it is scheduled to take place each year in January. The race is currently sponsored by JCB and run under the name of the JCB Triumph Trial Juvenile Hurdle – similar races of the same name also take place at Cheltenham's November and December meetings.

The race was first run in 1985 and winners of the race usually go on to participate in the Triumph Hurdle in March. Since 1989 three horses have achieved victory in both events – Katchit in 2007, Peace And Co in 2015 and Defi Du Seuil in 2017.

Winners
{| class = "sortable" | border="1" style="border-collapse: collapse; font-size:90%"
|- bgcolor="#77dd77" align="center"
! Year
! Winner
! Jockey
! Trainer
|-
|1985||Out of The Gloom
|Jonjo O'Neill
|Peter Easterby
|-
|1986||Tangognat
|Peter Scudamore
|Rod Simpson
|-bgcolor="#eeeeee"
|1987Abandoned because of frost
|-
| 1988
| width=170px | Jason's Quest
| width=190px | M Williams
| width=190px | John Baker
|-
| 1989
| Highland Bud
| Richard Dunwoody
| David Nicholson
|-
| 1990
| Sayyure
| Graham McCourt
| Nigel Tinkler
|-
| 1991
| Hopscotch
| Peter Scudamore
| Martin Pipe
|- bgcolor="#eeeeee"
| 1992Abandoned due to frost
|-
| 1993
| Major Bugler
| Adrian Maguire
| Toby Balding
|-
| 1994
| Pridwell
| Richard Dunwoody
| Martin Pipe
|-
| 1995
| Brave Tornado
| Tony McCoy
| Toby Balding
|- bgcolor="#eeeeee"
| 1996Abandoned due to frost
|-
| 1997
| Shooting Light
| Richard Dunwoody
| Pat Murphy
|-
| 1998
| Zafarabad
| Richard Johnson
| David Nicholson
|-
| 1999
| Hors La Loi III
| Thierry Doumen
| François Doumen
|-
| 2000
| Mister Banjo
| Mick Fitzgerald
| Nicky Henderson
|-
| 2001
| Jair du Cochet
| Jacques Ricou
| Guillaume Macaire
|-
| 2002
| Vol Solitaire
| Joe Tizzard
| Paul Nicholls
|-
| 2003
| Moneytrain
| Robert Thornton
| Christian von der Recke
|-
| 2004
| Mondul
| Ollie McPhail
| Milton Harris
|-
| 2005
| Akilak
| Graham Lee
| Howard Johnson
|- bgcolor="#eeeeee"
| 2006Abandoned due to frost
|-
| 2007
| Katchit
| Robert Thornton
| Alan King
|-
| 2008
| Franchoek
| Robert Thornton
| Alan King
|-
| 2009
| Walkon
| Robert Thornton
| Alan King
|-
| 2010
| Baccalaureate
| Paddy Brennan
| Nigel Twiston-Davies
|-
| 2011
| Local Hero
| Tony McCoy
| Steve Gollings
|-
| 2012
| Grumeti
| Wayne Hutchinson
| Alan King
|-
| 2013
| Rolling Star
| Barry Geraghty
| Nicky Henderson
|-
| 2014
| Le Rocher
| Richard Johnson
| Nick Williams
|-
| 2015
| Peace And Co
| Barry Geraghty
| Nicky Henderson
|-
| 2016
| Protek Des Flos
| Noel Fehily
| Nicky Henderson
|-
| 2017
| Defi Du Seuil
| Barry Geraghty
| Philip Hobbs
|-
| 2018
| Apple's Shakira
| Barry Geraghty
| Nicky Henderson
|-
| 2019
| Fakir D'oudairies
| J. J. Slevin
| Joseph O'Brien
|-
| 2020
| Galahad Quest
| Harry Cobden
| Nick Williams
|-bgcolor="#eeeeee"
|2021Abandoned because of water logging
|-
| 2022
| Pied Piper
|Davy Russell
| Gordon Elliott
|-
| 2023
| Comfort Zone
| Jonjo O'Neill Jr
| Joseph O'Brien
|}

See also
 Horse racing in Great Britain
 List of British National Hunt races

References
 Racing Post:

 pedigreequery.com – Finesse Juvenile Novices' Hurdle – Cheltenham.

National Hunt races in Great Britain
Cheltenham Racecourse
National Hunt hurdle races
Recurring sporting events established in 1985
1985 establishments in England